Bethan Russ is a Welsh international lawn bowler.

Bowls career
In 2017, Russ won a gold medal in the mixed four at the 11th European Bowls Championships.

In 2019 she won the fours gold medal at the Atlantic Bowls Championships

References

Welsh female bowls players
Living people
Year of birth missing (living people)
Bowls European Champions